Time's Arrow is an EP by the American musical project Prurient, the performing name of the artist Dominick Fernow. It was released on October 25, 2011 through Hydra Head Records, and was described as "taking a bold step away from the sounds which drew attention his way in the formative years."

The EP's title track "Time's Arrow" references both the novel Time's Arrow and the Black Dahlia murder.

Track listing
 "Time's Arrow" – 7:38
 "Time's Arrow (Unsolved)" – 4:05
 "Let's Make a Slave (De-Shelled)" – 1:55
 "Maskless Face" – 3:07
 "Slavery In the Bahamas" (instrumental) – 6:35

References

External links
 Time's Arrow on Bandcamp

2011 EPs
Prurient albums
Hydra Head Records EPs